This article contains information about the literary events and publications of 2003.

Events
February 12 – An invitation from the First Lady of the United States, Laura Bush, for some poets to attend a conference at the White House is postponed when one of them, Sam Hamill, organizes a "Poets Against the War" group for poetry readings across the United States on the same date.
February 15 – Anti-war protests occur in London. They are later used as the setting for Ian McEwan's 2005 novel Saturday.
March – The University of Mosul library is damaged and looted during the Iraq War, but many volumes are removed for protection by staff.
April 14 – The Iraq National Library and Archive is burned down during the Battle of Baghdad.
April – Nicholas Hytner succeeds Sir Trevor Nunn as artistic director of London's Royal National Theatre.
November 7 – UNESCO places among the Masterpieces of the Oral and Intangible Heritage of Humanity wayang kulit, a shadow puppet theatre and best known of the Indonesian wayang.

New books

Fiction
Peter Ackroyd – The Clerkenwell Tales
Chimamanda Ngozi Adichie – Purple Hibiscus
Mitch Albom – The Five People You Meet in Heaven
Monica Ali – Brick Lane 
Martin Amis – Yellow Dog
Margaret Atwood – Oryx and Crake
Paul Auster – Oracle Night
Max Barry – Jennifer Government
Greg Bear – Darwin's Children
Frédéric Beigbeder – Windows on the World
Hilari Bell – Fall of a Kingdom
Thomas Berger – Best Friends
Giles Blunt – The Delicate Storm
Frank Brennan – Tampering with Asylum
Dan Brown – The Da Vinci Code
Angus Peter Campbell – An Oidhche Mus Do Sheol Sinn
Lars Saabye Christensen – Maskeblomstfamilien
Paulo Coelho – Eleven Minutes
J. M. Coetzee – Elizabeth Costello
Deborah Joy Corey – The Skating Pond
Bernard Cornwell
Sharpe's Havoc
Sharpe's Christmas
Heretic
Douglas Coupland – Hey Nostradamus!
Robert Crais – The Last Detective
Julie E. Czerneda – Space, Inc.
Jeffery Deaver – Twisted
Don DeLillo – Cosmopolis
Cory Doctorow
A Place So Foreign and Eight More
Down and Out in the Magic Kingdom
Gerard Donovan – Schopenhauer's Telescope
Fernanda Eberstadt – The Furies
Rodrigo Fresán – Jardines de Kensington
Cornelia Funke – Inkheart
Anna Gavalda – I Wish Someone Were Waiting for Me Somewhere (translation)
William Gibson – Pattern Recognition
Newt Gingrich and William R. Forstchen – Gettysburg: A Novel of the Civil War
Jean-Christophe Grangé – L'Empire des loups
John Grisham – The King of Torts
Margaret Peterson Haddix – Among the Barons
Mark Haddon – The Curious Incident of the Dog in the Night-Time
Pete Hamill – Forever
Joanne Harris – Holy Fools
Victor Heck – The Asylum
Vol 2 – The Violent Ward
Vol 3 – The Quiet Ward
Jennifer Haigh – Mrs. Kimble
Zoë Heller – Notes on a Scandal
Khaled Hosseini – The Kite Runner
Michel Houellebecq – Lanzarote
Alan Judd – The Kaiser's Last Kiss
N. M. Kelby – Theater of the Stars: A Novel of Physics and Memory
Thomas Keneally – The Tyrant's Novel
Greg Keyes – The Final Prophecy
Stephen King – Wolves of the Calla
Dean R. Koontz – The Face
Jhumpa Lahiri – The Namesake
Dennis Lehane – Shutter Island
Jonathan Lethem – The Fortress of Solitude
James Luceno – The Unifying Force
Steve Martini – The Arraignment
Magnus Mills – The Scheme for Full Employment
Paul Murray – An Evening of Long Goodbyes
Julie Myerson – Something Might Happen
Andrew Neiderman – The Baby Squad
Audrey Niffenegger – The Time Traveler's Wife
Garth Nix – Mister Monday
Chuck Palahniuk – Diary
Christopher Paolini – Eragon
Carolyn Parkhurst – The Dogs of Babel
Per Petterson – Out Stealing Horses (Ut og stjæle hester)
DBC Pierre – Vernon God Little
Terry Pratchett
Monstrous Regiment
The Wee Free Men
Jean Raspail – Les Royaumes de Borée
Matthew Reilly – Scarecrow
Nina Revoyr – Southland
Tom Robbins – Villa Incognito
J. Jill Robinson – Residual Desire
Nick Sagan – Idlewild
Matthew Sharpe – The Sleeping Father
Michael Slade – Bed of Nails
Wilbur Smith – Blue Horizon
Olen Steinhauer – The Bridge of Sighs
Neal Stephenson – Quicksilver  (Vol. I of the Baroque Cycle)
Matthew Stover – Shatterpoint
Anthony Swofford – Jarhead
Miguel Sousa Tavares – Equador
Adam Thirlwell – Politics
Akira Toriyama (鳥山 明) – Toccio the Angel (Tenshi no Tocchio)
Sergio Troncoso – The Nature of Truth
Andrew Vachss – The Getaway ManMario Vargas Llosa – The Way to Paradise (El paraíso en la otra esquina)Jo Walton – Tooth and ClawIrvine Welsh – PornoTobias Wolff – Old SchoolRoger Zelazny – Manna from Heaven (short stories)

Children and young people
David Almond – The Fire-EatersAtsuko Asano – No. 6 (あさの あつこ)Cressida Cowell – How to Train Your Dragon (first in the eponymous series of 16 books)
Madonna - The English RosesElizabeth Laird – The Garbage KingJim Murphy – An American Plague: the true and terrifying story of the yellow fever epidemic of 1793Jenny Nimmo – Charlie Bone and the Time TwisterTyne O'Connell – Pulling PrincesPhilip Reeve – Predator's GoldJ. K. Rowling – Harry Potter and the Order of the PhoenixLemony Snicket – The Slippery SlopeDugald Steer (with Helen Ward, Wayne Anderson, etc.) – Dragonology: The Complete Book of DragonsMo Willems - Don't Let the Pigeon Drive the Bus! (first in a series of 8 books)
Ann Turnbull – No Shame, No FearKay Winters (with Barry Moser) – Voices of Ancient EgyptYang Hongying (楊紅櫻) – Four Troublemakers (四个调皮蛋, first in the Mo's Mischief – 淘气包马小跳 – series of 8 books)
Peter H. Reynolds - The DotDrama
Jordi Galceran – El mètode Grönholm (The Grönholm method)Richard Greenberg – The Violet HourDavid Hare – The Permanent WayKwame Kwei-Armah – Elmina's KitchenLynn Nottage – Intimate ApparelMark O'Rowe – CrestfallAbhi Subedi – Agniko KathaPoetry

Lavinia Greenlaw – MinskPope John Paul II – Roman Triptych. MeditationsDean Kalimniou – Kipos EsokleistosNon–fictionBanglapedia – National Encyclopedia of BangladeshNeal Bascomb – Higher: A Historic Race to the Sky and the Making of a CityPatricia Brown – A League Of My Own: Memoir of a Pitcher for the All-American GirlsAndrea Curtis – Into the BlueRichard Dawkins – A Devil's Chaplain: Reflections on Hope, Lies, Science, and LoveGerina Dunwich – Dunwich's Guide to Gemstone SorceryMarc Ferro – Le Livre noir du colonialismeJohn Fowles – The Journals – Volume 1Anna Funder – StasilandMattias Gardell – Gods of the BloodA. C. Grayling – What Is Good?: The Search for the Best Way to LiveChristopher Hitchens – A Long Short War: The Postponed Liberation of IraqErik Larson – The Devil in the White City: Murder, Magic, and Madness at the Fair That Changed AmericaBethany McLean – The Smartest Guys in the RoomDon Miller – Blue Like JazzMichael Moore – Dude, Where's My Country?Azar Nafisi – Reading Lolita in TehranAlanna Nash – The Colonel: The Extraordinary Story of Colonel Tom Parker and Elvis PresleyDaniel Okrent – Great Fortune: The Epic of Rockefeller CenterChuck Palahniuk – Fugitives and Refugees: A Walk in Portland, OregonRudy Ruiz – ¡ADELANTE!: una guía personal del éxito para usted y su familia (a guide for success for immigrants)
Jane Smiley – Charles DickensClark Ashton Smith – Selected Letters of Clark Ashton SmithDavid Starkey – Six Wives: The Queens of Henry VIIILynne McTaggart – The Field: The Quest for the Secret Force of the UniverseAmy Tan – The Opposite of Fate: A Book of MusingsLynne Truss – Eats, Shoots & LeavesPenny Wolfson – MoonriseDeaths
January 5 – Jean Kerr, American author and playwright (born 1923)
January 21 – Paul Haines, American-born Canadian poet and songwriter (born 1933)
February 16 – Aleksandar Tišma, Serbian novelist (born 1924)
February 26 – Quentin Keynes, English explorer, writer and filmmaker (born 1921)
March 11 – Brian Cleeve, English-born Irish writer and broadcaster (born 1921)
March 12 – Howard Fast, American novelist (born 1914)
March 14 – Lucian Boz, Romanian and Australian literary critic (born 1908)
April 3 – Michael Kelly, American journalist (born 1957)
April 7 – Cecile de Brunhoff, French children's writer (born 1903)
June 21
George Axelrod, American dramatist and screenwriter (born 1922)
Leon Uris, American novelist (born 1924)
July 6 – Kathleen Raine, English poet, scholar, and translator (born 1908)
July 10 – Winston Graham, English novelist (born 1908)
July 14 – Éva Janikovszky, Hungarian novelist and children's writer (born 1926)
July 15 – Roberto Bolaño, Chilean-born fiction writer (born 1953)
July 16 – Carol Shields, American-born Canadian novelist (breast cancer; born 1935)
September 3 – Alan Dugan, American poet (born 1923)
September 24 – Derek Prince, English biblical scholar, author and radio presenter (born 1915)
September 25 – Edward Said, Palestinian-American literary critic (born 1935)
November 9 – Alan Davidson, Northern Irish historian and food writer (born 1924)
December 3 – Sita Ram Goel, Indian historian, publisher and author (born 1921)
December 11 – Ahmadou Kourouma, Ivorian writer (born 1927)
December 12 – Fadwa Toukan, Palestinian poet (born 1917)

Awards
Nobel Prize for Literature: J. M. Coetzee

Australia
The Australian/Vogel Literary Award: Nicholas Angel, Drown Them in the SeaC. J. Dennis Prize for Poetry: Emma Lew, Anything the Landlord TouchesKenneth Slessor Prize for Poetry: Jill Jones, Screens Jets HeavenMiles Franklin Award: Alex Miller, Journey to the Stone CountryCanada
Giller Prize: M. G. Vassanji – The In-Between World of Vikram LallSee 2003 Governor General's Awards for a complete list of the winners of those awards.
Griffin Poetry Prize: Margaret Avison, Concrete and Wild Carrot and Paul Muldoon, Moy sand and gravelEdna Staebler Award for Creative Non-Fiction: Alison Watt, The Last IslandSweden

Astrid Lindgren Memorial Award: Maurice Sendak and Christine Nöstlinger

United Kingdom
Booker Prize: DBC Pierre, Vernon God LittleCaine Prize for African Writing: Yvonne Adhiambo Owuor, "Weight of Whispers"
Carnegie Medal for children's literature: Jennifer Donnelly, A Gathering LightCholmondeley Award: Ciarán Carson, Michael Donaghy, Lavinia Greenlaw, Jackie Kay
David Cohen Prize: Beryl Bainbridge, Thom Gunn
Eric Gregory Award: Jen Hadfield, Zoë Brigley, Paul Batchelor, Olivia Cole, Sasha Dugdale, Anna Woodford
James Tait Black Memorial Prize for biography: Janet Browne, Charles Darwin: Volume 2 – The Power of PlaceJames Tait Black Memorial Prize for fiction: Andrew O'Hagan, PersonalityOrange Prize for Fiction: Valerie Martin, PropertyQueen's Gold Medal for Poetry: U. A. Fanthorpe
Whitbread Book of The Year Award: Mark Haddon, The Curious Incident of the Dog in the Night-Time: A NovelUnited States
Agnes Lynch Starrett Poetry Prize: David Shumate, High Water MarkAmerican Academy of Arts and Letters Gold Medal in Poetry: W. S. Merwin
Bernard F. Connors Prize for Poetry: Julie Sheehan, "Brown-headed Cow Birds"
Bollingen Prize for Poetry: Adrienne Rich
Brittingham Prize in Poetry: Brian Teare, The Room Where I Was BornCompton Crook Award: Patricia Bray, Devlin's LuckFrost Medal: Lawrence Ferlinghetti
Hugo Award: Robert J. Sawyer, HominidsLambda Literary Awards: Multiple categories; see 2003 Lambda Literary Awards
National Book Award for Fiction: Shirley Hazzard, The Great FireNational Book Critics Circle Award: Edward P. Jones, The Known WorldNewbery Medal for children's literature: Avi, Crispin: The Cross of LeadPEN/Faulkner Award for Fiction: Sabina Murray, The CapricesPulitzer Prize for Fiction: Jeffrey Eugenides, MiddlesexWallace Stevens Award: Richard Wilbur
Whiting Awards:
Fiction: Courtney Angela Brkic (fiction/nonfiction), Alexander Chee, Agymah Kamau, Ann Pancake, Lewis Robinson, Jess Row
Nonfiction: Christopher Cokinos, Trudy Dittmar
Plays: Sarah Ruhl
Poetry: Major Jackson

Other
Camões Prize: Rubem Fonseca
International Dublin Literary Award: Orhan Pamuk My Name is RedPremio Nadal: Andrés Trapiello, Los amigos del crimen perfecto''
SAARC Literary Award: Tissa Abeysekara, Laxman Gaikwad

See also
2003 in comics
2003 in Australian literature

Notes

References

 
Literature
Years of the 21st century in literature